Uinsky (masculine), Uinskaya (feminine), or Uinskoye (neuter) may refer to:
Uinsky District, a district of Perm Krai, Russia
Uinskoye, a rural locality (a selo) in Perm Krai, Russia